Gianni Michel Eugene Zuiverloon (born 30 December 1986) is a Dutch former footballer who plays as a centre back.

Club career

Early career

Zuiverloon was born in Rotterdam, Netherlands. He started his football career at the age of six at Feyenoord.

Due to the injury of a teammate (Dustley Mulder) at Feyenoord, coach Ruud Gullit selected Zuiverloon for the first team, where he made his debut in professional football in the season of 2004–05. His first game was against Willem II, on 22 August 2004. He played a total of ten games that season, scoring no goals. In order to get more first team experience he was loaned out to RKC Waalwijk in the 2005–06 season, where he played a total of 28 games.

In June 2006 he signed a three-year deal with his new club Heerenveen. The year before he was loaned to RKC Waalwijk, scoring his only goal that season against Heerenveen.

West Bromwich Albion

On 2 July 2008 it was confirmed by Heerenveen that Zuiverloon had signed a three-year deal, with an extra year in the club's favour, for West Bromwich Albion of the Premier League for £3.2 million. He made his debut for West Brom in a 2–1 loss against Everton. His first Albion goal came in the FA Cup, in the 3–1 defeat to Burnley on 3 February 2009. Following West Brom losing to Liverpool 2–0, Albion were relegated to the Championship after one season in the Premier League.

In his second season, Zuiverloon established himself in the first team under manager Roberto Di Matteo. He scored his first league goal for West Brom in a 5–0 win over Watford on 31 October 2009 and went on to score in both games against Scunthorpe United, and against Cardiff City, as his team secured promotion to the Premier League after finishing second place in the Championship.

In his third season for West Brom, Zuiverloon's first-team opportunities were limited while he made three starts in the League Cup scoring in a 2–1 win against Manchester City on 22 September 2010. He was loaned out to Championship side Ipswich Town on the last day of the loan window. He later on returned to his parent club, after four appearances for Ipswich, in December 2010 as Di Matteo faced a defensive crisis. Zuiverloon made his return against Manchester United on 1 January 2011. Three days later, he made his last Premier League match for West Brom Albion against Fulham in a 3–0 loss. Following the match, he criticised Fulham defender John Pantsil for the tackle that forced Marek Cech out of game.

Zuiverloon announced he would leave the club in the summer and join a new club where he could play regularly. Eventually, he was released by the club on 25 May 2011 along with his teammates Abdoulaye Meite and Giles Barnes.

Later career
On 10 July 2011, Zuiverloon signed a three-year deal for Spanish side Mallorca on a free transfer. He made his debut for the club as they beat Espanyol 1–0 on 29 August 2011. On 15 July 2012, Zuiverloon returned to Heerenveen on loan.

After his contract with Mallorca had been dissolved, Zuiverloon signed a three-year deal with Eredivisie side ADO Den Haag as a free agent in August 2013. Three years later, he returned to Spain with Segunda División B club Cultural y Deportiva Leonesa.

On 31 August 2018, Zuiverloon switched to Indian Super League club Delhi Dynamos FC. The following 26 June, he switched to Kerala Blasters FC in the same league.

International career
Born in the Netherlands, Zuiverloon is of Surinamese descent. Zuiverloon was a Netherlands Under 21 regular.

In 2007 Zuiverloon was called up by Jong Oranje coach Foppe de Haan to be part of his squad for the 2007 UEFA European Under-21 Football Championship held in the Netherlands. Zuiverloon participated in both of their first round group matches against Israel (1–0 win) and Portugal (2–1 win) to secure a semi final spot and to qualify for the 2008 Summer Olympics. In the semi finals against England Zuiverloon had a great effort, playing a quality match which ended in 1–1 after extra time. In the following penalty shoot-out, with 32 kicks taken, Zuiverloon forced the decision with his strike past Scott Carson and brought the Dutch into their second straight final. The Dutch went on to retain their 2006 title by beating Serbia 4–1 in the final. After the tournament he was named in the 'UEFA Team of the tournament'. At the 2008 Olympics he helped the Netherlands to reach the quarter-finals, where they were defeated 2–1 by Argentina.

Career statistics
''As of 20 October 2019.

Honours

Club
Cultural Leonesa
Segunda División B: 2016–17

International
Netherlands U21
UEFA European Under-21 Football Championship (1): 2007

References

External links

 Voetbal International profile 
Premier League profile

 Gianni Zuiverloon Interview

1986 births
Living people
Footballers from Rotterdam
Dutch sportspeople of Surinamese descent
Dutch footballers
Association football defenders
Eredivisie players
Feyenoord players
RKC Waalwijk players
SC Heerenveen players
ADO Den Haag players
Premier League players
West Bromwich Albion F.C. players
Ipswich Town F.C. players
La Liga players
Segunda División B players
RCD Mallorca players
Cultural Leonesa footballers
Indian Super League players
Odisha FC players
Netherlands youth international footballers
Netherlands under-21 international footballers
Footballers at the 2008 Summer Olympics
Olympic footballers of the Netherlands
Dutch expatriate footballers
Dutch expatriate sportspeople in England
Dutch expatriate sportspeople in Spain
Dutch expatriate sportspeople in India
Expatriate footballers in England
Expatriate footballers in Spain
Expatriate footballers in India
Kerala Blasters FC players